Rudolf Höhnl (born 21 April 1946 in Pernink) is a Czechoslovakian former ski jumper. He won the bronze medal in the individual large hill at the 1974 FIS Nordic World Ski Championships in Falun.

External links

Czechoslovak male ski jumpers
Czech male ski jumpers
Olympic ski jumpers of Czechoslovakia
1946 births
Living people
Ski jumpers at the 1968 Winter Olympics
Ski jumpers at the 1972 Winter Olympics
Ski jumpers at the 1976 Winter Olympics
FIS Nordic World Ski Championships medalists in ski jumping
People from Karlovy Vary District
Sportspeople from the Karlovy Vary Region